Portland ministry may refer to:

 First Portland ministry, the British government led by the Duke of Portland from April to December 1783
 Second Portland ministry, the British government led by the Duke of Portland from 1807 to 1809